Taitou is a town of around 58,000 people in the north of Shandong province, People's Republic of China. Within the town are 42 administrative villages.

In 1958, Taitou was created as a people's commune, then changed to a town in 1984. In 2000 it absorbed the town of Niutou.

Taitou was the site of Martin C. Yang's ethnography A Chinese Village: Taitou, Shantung Province (1945).

References

Further reading

Township-level divisions of Shandong